= I Am a Comedian =

2022 documentary film by Fumiari Hyuga

I Am a Comedian is a 2022 Japanese documentary film directed by Fumiari Hyuga. The documentary focuses on the stand-up comedian Daisuke Muramoto's career trajectory, which had its leaps and bounds, portraying how his stand-up comedy performances were shunned by the general audience after having once gained a significant fanbase. In July 2023, the film had its premiere at Japan Cuts.
